The following lists events that happened during 1970 in New Zealand.

Population
 Estimated population as of 31 December: 2,852,100
 Increase since 31 December 1969: 48,100 (1.72%)
 Males per 100 females: 99.9

Incumbents

Regal and viceregal
Head of State – Elizabeth II
Governor-General – Sir Arthur Porritt Bt GCMG GCVO CBE.

Government
The 36th Parliament of New Zealand commenced, with the second National government in power.
Speaker of the House – Roy Jack.
Prime Minister – Keith Holyoake
Deputy Prime Minister – Jack Marshall.
Minister of Finance – Robert Muldoon.
Minister of Foreign Affairs – Keith Holyoake.
Attorney-General – Jack Marshall.
Chief Justice — Sir Richard Wild

Parliamentary opposition
 Leader of the Opposition –   Norman Kirk (Labour).

Main centre leaders
Mayor of Auckland – Dove-Myer Robinson
Mayor of Hamilton – Mike Minogue
Mayor of Wellington – Frank Kitts
Mayor of Christchurch – Ron Guthrey
Mayor of Dunedin – Jim Barnes

Events
 15 January – Police and anti-Vietnam war protestors clash outside the Intercontinental Hotel in Auckland, where visiting U.S. Vice-president Spiro Agnew is staying.
 20 July – Christchurch is awarded the hosting rights to the 1974 British Commonwealth Games.
The North Island natural gas network is commissioned following the completion of the Kapuni gas treatment plant. Natural gas is initially available in Auckland, Hamilton, New Plymouth, Hawera, Wanganui, Palmerston North, Levin and Wellington.

Arts and literature
Edward Middleton wins the Robert Burns Fellowship.

See 1970 in art, 1970 in literature, :Category:1970 books

Music

New Zealand Music Awards
The winners in the New Zealand Music Awards were
Loxene Golden Disc SOLOIST AWARD  Craig Scott – Lets Get A Little Sentimental
Loxene Golden Disc GROUP AWARD   Hogsnort Rupert – Pretty Girl

See: 1970 in music

Performing arts

 Benny Award presented by the Variety Artists Club of New Zealand to Howard Morrison and Oswald Astley Cheesman.

Radio and Television
The Feltex Television Awards begin.
Best Arts: Green Gin Sunset
Best Light Entertainment: The Alpha Plan
Public Affairs: Gallery for Brian Edwards' interview with Christiaan Barnard.
Best Documentary: Three Score Years and Then
Professional (TVPDA award): David Gardner
 Radio Hauraki granted the very first commercial licence in New Zealand breaking the government monopoly of the radio airwaves.

See: 1970 in New Zealand television, 1970 in television, List of TVNZ television programming, :Category:Television in New Zealand, :Category:New Zealand television shows, Public broadcasting in New Zealand

Film
See: :Category:1970 film awards, 1970 in film, List of New Zealand feature films, Cinema of New Zealand, :Category:1970 films

Sport
See: 1970 in sports, :Category:1970 in sports ,

Athletics
 Jeff Julian wins his fourth national title in the men's marathon, clocking 2:24:32 on 7 March in Napier.

British Commonwealth Games

Chess
 The 77th National Chess Championship is held in Auckland, and is won by Ortvin Sarapu of Auckland (his 11th title).

Horse racing

Harness racing
 New Zealand Trotting Cup: James
 Auckland Trotting Cup: Stella Frost

Shooting
 Ballinger Belt – Maurie Gordon (Okawa)

Soccer
 Establishment of the New Zealand National Soccer League
 Blockhouse Bay are the first National Soccer Champions.
 The Chatham Cup is won by Blockhouse Bay, who beat Western Suburbs FC (Wellington) 3–2 in a replay after the final ended at 2–2 after extra time.
 Northern League premier division (Thompson Shield) – Mount Albert
 Central League first division – Waterside
 Southern League first division – Christchurch Technical
 Promoted to NSL for 1971: Mount Albert-Ponsonby (following a merger) and Caversham (runners up in Southern League, as Christchurch Technical were connected to Christchurch United).

Births
12 January: Brett Leaver, field hockey player
 4 May: Paul Wiseman, cricketer
 20 May: David Smail, golfer
 13 June: Chris Cairns, cricketer
 20 June: Maia Lewis, cricketer
 9 August: Deborah Morris, politician
 13 August: Glenn Jonas, cricketer
 7 September: Guy Callaghan, butterfly swimmer
 22 September: Hitro Okesene, rugby league player
 19 October: Whetu Taewa, rugby league player
 27 October (in Samoa): Alama Ieremia, rugby player
 5 November: Andrew Hastie, field hockey player
 3 December: Karen Smith, field hockey player
 5 December: Matthew Horne, cricketer
 Catherine Chidgey, novelist
 Danielle Cormack, actor
 Katherine Dienes, organist and composer
 Nicola Kawana, actor
 Nanaia Mahuta, politician
 Simon Power, politician
 Katrina Shanks, politician
 Metiria Turei, politician

Deaths
 27 January: Rita Angus, painter.
 28 February: Brian Hewat, politician.
 2 June: Bruce McLaren, racing driver and car designer.
 24 June: Tiaki Omana, politician.
 1 October: Reginald Bedford Hammond, surveyor, architect, town planner and senior public servant
 Philip Connolly, politician.
 Sir Charles Cotton, geologist.
 Hon. Jack Watts, politician.
:Category:1970 deaths

See also
List of years in New Zealand
Timeline of New Zealand history
History of New Zealand
Military history of New Zealand
Timeline of the New Zealand environment
Timeline of New Zealand's links with Antarctica

For world events and topics in 1970 not specifically related to New Zealand see: 1970

References

External links

 
New Zealand
Years of the 20th century in New Zealand